Hypena gonospilalis is a species of moth of the family Erebidae first described by Francis Walker in 1866. It is found across the South Pacific, including the Cook Islands, Japan and Taiwan as well as the Australian state of Queensland.

The forewings are grey or brown patterned with an interior irregular dark area. The hindwings are plain brown.

References

Moths described in 1866
gonospilalis
Moths of Japan
Moths of Taiwan
Moths of Oceania